Phaedropsis chromalis is a moth in the family Crambidae. It was described by Achille Guenée in 1854. It is found in French Guiana and Brazil.

References

Spilomelinae
Moths described in 1854